Col Agnel is a mountain pass in the Cottian Alps, west of Monte Viso between France and Italy which links the Queyras valley (Hautes-Alpes) with Pontechianale in the province of Cuneo, Piedmont.

At 2,744 m (9,003 ft), it is the third highest paved road pass of the Alps, after Stelvio Pass and Col de l'Iseran.

Despite being the highest international pass of the Alps, Col Agnel is somewhat unknown and not heavily used. It is one of the many passes suggested as the route taken by Hannibal in his march, with elephants, to attack Rome at the start of the Second Punic War and a modern-era plaque, mounted on a rock on the French side, commemorates the event.

Cycling
From Château-Queyras (France), the climb is 20.5 km long at an average gradient of 6.6%. From Casteldelfino (Italy), the climb is 22.4 km long at an average gradient of 6.5%.

Tour de France 
The Col Agnel was crossed for the first time on 20 July 2008 during stage 15 of the 2008 Tour de France.
The Col Agnel was crossed for the Second Time on 21 July 2011 during Stage 18 of The 2011 Tour de France.

Giro d'Italia
The Col Agnel has been crossed twice during Giro d'Italia.

See also
 List of highest paved roads in Europe
 List of mountain passes

Notes

External links

 Profile starting from Castedelfino on climbbybike.com
 Profile starting from Guillestre on climbbybike.com
 Le col Agnel dans le Tour de France 
 Description of the climb (German)
 Cycling up to the Col Agnel: data, profile, map, photos and description

Mountain passes of the Alps
Landforms of Hautes-Alpes
Mountain passes of Provence-Alpes-Côte d'Azur
Mountain passes of Piedmont
Province of Cuneo
France–Italy border crossings
Transport in Provence-Alpes-Côte d'Azur